The 8 Hours of Bahrain (previously 6 Hours of Bahrain) (بطولة ست ساعات في البحرين) is a sports car race that is held at the Bahrain International Circuit in Sakhir, Bahrain. It was created for the FIA World Endurance Championship, and was held for the first time on 29 September 2012 as the sixth round of the 2012 World Endurance Championship. The creation of the race led to controversy, as the date for the inaugural race clashed with the 2012 Petit Le Mans.

2021 Double-header
On 7 July 2021, the ACO announced that the fifth round of the 2021 FIA World Endurance Championship in Fuji had been cancelled due to the travel restrictions related to the ongoing COVID-19 pandemic and replaced by the an additional 6-hour race in Bahrain on 30 October. The original 8 hour race would also be brought forward from 20 to 6 November, creating the first double-header in the championship's history.

Results

Statistics

Wins by manufacturer

References

 
Recurring sporting events established in 2012
Auto races in Bahrain
Recurring sporting events disestablished in 2017
2012 establishments in Bahrain